The Joyce Lester Shield is a trophy symbolizing the Under 23 Women's championship of the Australian Softball Federation. The Joyce Lester competition was first held in 1997 to bridge the gap between the Under 19 National Championships and Open National Championships. It is named after Joyce Lester, an Australian softball player and coach.

Champions

Previous Individual Award Winners 
2004
Most Valuable Player – Nicole Smith (Qld)
Pitching Award – Zara Mee (NSW)
Batting Award – Casey Williams (NT)
2005
Most Valuable Player – Tatiana Holodnow (NSW)
Pitching Award – Emily Gooding (NSW Country)
Batting Award – Tatiana Holodnow (NSW)
2006
Most Valuable Player -
Pitching Award -
Batting Award -
2007
Most Valuable Player -
Pitching Award -
Batting Award -
2008
Most Valuable Player -
Pitching Award -
Batting Award -

See also 
Australian Softball Federation
ASF National Championships
Laing Harrow Shield

References 

Softball competitions in Australia